Paulipalpus is a genus of parasitic flies in the family Tachinidae.

Species
Paulipalpus flavipes Barraclough, 1992
Paulipalpus zentae Barraclough, 1992

Distribution
Australia.

References

Dexiinae
Diptera of Australasia
Tachinidae genera